Olavi „Olli“ Remes (8 September 1909 – 31 December 1942) was a Finnish cross-country skier and military officer who competed in the 1930s.

Remes was born in Iisalmi and died in Krivi, East Karelia.

He won a bronze medal in 50 km at the 1934 FIS Nordic World Ski Championships. In the 1936 Winter Olympics he participated in the demonstration event, military patrol (precursor to biathlon), and finished second in the team event.

Cross-country skiing results
All results are sourced from the International Ski Federation (FIS).

World Championships
 1 medal – (1 bronze)

References

External links

1909 births
1942 deaths
People from Iisalmi
Finnish military patrol (sport) runners
Finnish male cross-country skiers
Military patrol competitors at the 1936 Winter Olympics
Olympic biathletes of Finland
FIS Nordic World Ski Championships medalists in cross-country skiing
Knights of the Mannerheim Cross
Finnish military personnel killed in World War II
Sportspeople from North Savo
20th-century Finnish people